The Chapada do Araripe, also known as the Serra do Araripe, is a chapada (plateau) in northeastern Brazil. The chapada forms the boundary of Ceará and Pernambuco states, and forms the watershed between the Jaguaribe River of Ceará, which flows northward into the Atlantic, and the much larger basin of the São Francisco River of Pernambuco and neighboring states, which drains eastward into the Atlantic. The Santana Formation, which is rich with fossils from the early Cretaceous, lies at the base of the chapada. The Araripe manakin (Antilophia bokermanni), a bird only described in 1998, is endemic to Chapada do Araripe.

Etymology 
The word "Araripe" stems from the Tupi word ararype, meaning "macaw at the river" (arara, macaw + 'y, river + pe, at).

References

Mountain ranges of Brazil
Global Geoparks Network members
Geoparks in Brazil
Landforms of Pernambuco